Sisurcana batalloana is a species of moth of the family Tortricidae. It is found in Venezuela.

The wingspan is about 29 mm. The ground colour of the forewings is cream brownish with cream parts suffused and strigulated (finely streaked) with brown. The hindwings are cream, tinged with brownish in the apical third and with weak brownish strigulation.

Etymology
The species name is derived from the name of the type locality: Batallón.

References

Moths described in 2006
Sisurcana
Moths of South America
Taxa named by Józef Razowski